Kiyevsky railway terminal (Kievskiy vokzal) also known as Moscow Kiyevskaya railway station (Moskva-Kievskaya) is one of the nine railway terminals of Moscow, Russia. It is the only railway station in Moscow to have a frontage on the Moskva River. The station is located at the Square of Europe, in the beginning of Bolshaya Dorogomilovskaya Street in Dorogomilovo District of Moscow. A hub of the Moscow Metro is located nearby.

As the name suggests, there are regular services to Kyiv (Kiev). There used to be regular services to  Belgrade, Zagreb, Varna, Bucharest, Sofia, Niš, Budapest, Prague, Vienna and Venice as well. 15-20 years ago, all these trains were canceled, some were transferred to the Belorussky railway station.

History and design
The station was built between 1914 and 1918 in the Byzantine Revival style, which is especially pronounced in the  clocktower. Originally named the Bryansk station, it was designed by Ivan Rerberg and Vladimir Shukhov, and is considered an important landmark of architecture and engineering of the time.

The station building is flanked by a gigantic train shed which is distinguished by its simplicity and constructive boldness. The platforms are covered by a massive glazed parabolic structure (length , width , height ) weighing over 1250 tons. Its open-work steel trusses are clearly visible, and they demonstrate the elegance of the grandiose building.

In February 2011, the police uncovered illegal immigrants living in the subterranean rooms of the train station.

Trains and destinations

Directions and countries

1 — in connection with the spread of the COVID-19 pandemic in Russia, restrictions have been introduced when crossing state borders. These trains are canceled until further notice. The Russo-Ukrainian crisis may be a reason.

Suburban destinations
Suburban commuter trains (elektrichka) connect Kiyevsky station with stations and platforms of the Kiyevsky suburban railway line, in particular with the towns of Aprelevka, Nara, Balabanovo, Obninsk, Maloyaroslavets and Kaluga-I.

Vnukovo International Airport connections
Kiyevsky station is connected to Vnukovo International Airport by Aeroexpress trains, which are not operated by Russian Railways, though they use the same tracks.

Gallery

Notes

References
 
 
 Rainer Graefe, “Vladimir G. Suchov 1853-1939. Die Kunst der sparsamen Konstruktion”, 192 S., Deutsche Verlags-Anstalt, Stuttgart, 1990, .
 Fausto Giovannardi,"Vladimir G. Shukhov e la leggerezza dell’acciaio", Borgo San Lorenzo, 2007. 
 Е. М. Шухова, «Владимир Григорьевич Шухов. Первый инженер России.», 368 стр., МГТУ, Москва, 2003, .

External links

Kiyevsky station Official site 
Aeroexpress 
Russian Railways (Российские Железные Дороги) 
Ukrainian Railways (Українські залізниці) 
Moldova Railways (Calea Ferată din Moldova) 
V. G. Shukhov - Russian engineer

Railway stations in Moscow
Roof structures by Vladimir Shukhov
Railway stations in Russia opened in 1918
Tourist attractions in Moscow
Byzantine Revival architecture in Russia
Railway stations of Moscow Railway
Cultural heritage monuments of federal significance in Moscow